The Royal College Choir is one of the oldest college choirs in Sri Lanka. Established formally as the choir of Royal College Colombo in 1955, it could trace its roots far beyond and has a history of over 90 years.

History
The Royal College Choir traces its roots to its origins as a church choir at St. Paul's Chapel in the mid 19th century. In 1919 the Royal College Music Society (now the Western Music Society) was formed under  of Major H.L. Reed, MC the Principal of Royal College. The choir formed by the society under the guidance of Mrs. H. L. Reed and R. C. Edwards, won the Meaden Shield in the 1920. The formal Royal College Choir was established in 1955 which continues to this day.

Composers
Kala Suri Dilup Gabadamudalige

Notable former members
Ranidu Lankage

External links

Official site
Royal College presents ‘Festival of Choirs 2011’

Boys' and men's choirs
Choir
Choir
Musical groups established in 1955
1955 establishments in Ceylon